The 2008 AIBA Women's World Boxing Championships was an international women's boxing competition hosted by China from November 22 to 29, 2008 in Ningbo City. It was the 5th championship, which debuted 2001 in Scranton, Pennsylvania, United States.

The World Championship was contested in 13 weight disciplines by 218 amateur women boxers from 41 countries, and was conducted in the Ningbo Sports Center.

China won four gold, two silver and four bronze medals, while Turkey finished second with two gold and two bronze medals, followed by Canada with a tally of 2-0-1. India, the champion in the 2006 edition, were fourth with one gold, one silver and two bronze.

Participating nations

Medal summary

Medalists

1 Ying Chen (China) originally won the gold medal but was disqualified for failing doping test.

Medal table

Competitions

Preliminary rounds

Quarterfinals

Semifinals

Finals

References

External links
 5th AIBA Women's World Boxing Championships Ningbo City 2008

W
Boxing
Women's World Boxing Championships
International boxing competitions hosted by China
2008 in women's boxing
Sport in Ningbo